Kunashir Island, possibly meaning Black Island or Grass Island in Ainu, is the southernmost island of the Kuril Islands archipelago. The island has been under Russian administration since the end of World War II, when Soviet forces took possession of the Kurils. It is claimed by Japan (see Kuril Islands dispute).

Geography
Kunashir lies between the straits of Kunashir Island, Catherine, Izmena, and South Kuril. Kunashir Island is visible from the nearby Japanese island of Hokkaido, from which it is separated by the Nemuro Strait.

Area: 
Length: 
Width: 

Kunashir Island is formed by four volcanoes which were separate islands but have since joined together by low-lying areas with lakes and hot springs. All these volcanoes are still active: Tyatya, Smirnov, Mendeleev (Rausu-yama), and Golovnin (Tomari-yama). The island is made up of volcanic and crystalline rocks.

Environment
The climate is humid continental with very heavy precipitation especially in the autumn and a strong seasonal lag with maximum temperatures in August and September. The vegetation mostly consists of spruce, pine, fir, and mixed deciduous forests with lianas and Kuril bamboo underbrush. The mountains are covered with birch and Siberian Dwarf Pine scrub, herbaceous flowers or bare rocks. Tree cores of century-old oaks (Quercus crispula) were found in July 2001 on Kunashiri Island.

Important Bird Area
Kunashir, along with the neighbouring Lesser Kuril Chain of smaller islands, has been recognised as an Important Bird Area (IBA) by BirdLife International as the island supports populations of various threatened bird species, including many waterbirds, seabirds and waders.

History
The original inhabitants of the islandas with most of Hokkaido and the Kurilswere the Ainu. Europeans are first recorded visiting this part of the Kurils in 1643 when the  under Maarten Gerritsz Vries was exploring Hokkaido and the surrounding area for the Dutch East India Company (VOC). Vries's account of the area was incredibly garbledincluding a fictitious continental extension dubbed Company Landbut while his imaginary Staten Island is usually connected to Iturup, its placement on most maps of the period more closely resembles the location of Kunashir. Vitus Bering's lieutenant Martin Spanberg mapped the actual locations of the Kurils including Kunashir in a series of voyages in 1738, 1739, and 1742 but Company Land and Staten Island continued to appear in European maps decades afterwards.

The Japanese expanded north to Kunashir in the 18th century, with the Matsumae clan establishing a fishery and trading site called Kunashiri-basho in 1754. Its headquarters was located in Tomari (present-day Golovnino) and administered Kunashir, Iturup, and Urup.

In 1789 Kunashir Island was one of the settings of the Menashi-Kunashiri Battle in which native Ainu revolted against Yamato Japanese tradespeople and colonists.

Russian navigator Vasily Golovnin attempted to map and explore the island in 1811, but was apprehended by Japanese authorities and spent two years in prison.

On September 1, 1945, or one day before the surrender documents of World War II were signed on September 2, 1945, in accordance with understandings reached at the Yalta Conference, the Soviet Union invaded and occupied the Kuril Islands. This occurred after the Soviet Union renounced the Soviet–Japanese Neutrality Pact signed in April 1941, and declared war on Japan on August 9, 1945 (formally, the pact itself remained in effect until April 13, 1946). Although Japan agreed after deliberations to cede its claims to "the Kurile Islands" as part of the Treaty of San Francisco in 1951, the Japanese government has claimed since the mid-1950s that the southern islands were not part of the ceded Kuril Islands.

Settlements
The largest settlement on Kunashir Island is Yuzhno-Kurilsk, administrative center of Yuzhno-Kurilsky District.

Economy
The primary economic activity is fishing. The island has a port next to Yuzhno-Kurilsk. Kunashir Island enjoys a Mendeleevskaya GeoPP geothermal power plant with the capacity of 1.8 MW.

Transport
The island is served by Mendeleyevo Airport.

Population
After the 1994 earthquake, about one-third of Kunashir Island's population left and did not return. By 2002, the island's population was approximately 7,800. The total population of the disputed Kuril islands at that time was approximately 17,000.

See also
Kuril Islands dispute

References

Notes

General references

Flights to Kunashir Island banned

External links
Sakhalin Oblast

 
Islands of the Kuril Islands
Islands of the Pacific Ocean
Islands of the Russian Far East
Disputed islands
Japan–Soviet Union relations
Southern Kuriles
Important Bird Areas of the Kurile Islands
Seabird colonies